The  was one of the four most important clans that dominated Japanese politics during the Heian, Kamakura and Muromachi Periods of Japanese history – the others being the Fujiwara, the Tachibana, and the Minamoto. The clan is divided into four major groups, named after the emperor they descended from: Kanmu Heishi, Ninmyō Heishi, Montoku Heishi, and Kōkō Heishi.

History

Along with the Minamoto, Taira was one of the honorary surnames given by the emperors of the Heian Period (794–1185 CE) to their children and grandchildren who were not considered eligible for the throne.

The clan was founded when the Imperial Court grew too large, and the emperor ordered that the descendants of previous emperors from several generations ago would no longer be princes, but would instead be given noble surnames and ranks. The decision became applicable during the reign of Emperor Kanmu (782–805) and thus, together with the Taira clan, the Minamoto clan was born.

Some grandchildren of Emperor Kanmu were the first to bear the name of Taira, after 825. Later, the descendants of Emperor Nimmyo, Emperor Montoku and Emperor Koko also received the surname. The specific hereditary lines of these emperors are referred to by the posthumous name of the emperor followed by Heishi, for example Kanmu Heishi.

The Kanmu Heishi line, founded in 889 by Taira no Takamochi (great-grandson of the 50th Emperor Kanmu, who reigned from 781 to 806) proved to be the strongest and most dominant line during the Heian period. Later, another member of this lineage, Taira no Kiyomori, created what was considered the first samurai government in the history of Japan. A great-grandson of Takamochi, Taira no Korehira, moved to Ise Province (currently part of Mie Prefecture) and established an important Daimyo dynasty. Masamori, his grandson; and Tadamori, his great-grandson, became loyal supporters of Emperor Shirakawa and Emperor Toba, respectively.

Taira no Kiyomori, son and heir of Tadamori, rose to the position of Daijō Daijin (great Minister of State), after his victories in the Hōgen Rebellion (1156) and the Heiji Rebellion (1160). Kiyomori succeeded in enthroning his youngest grandson as Emperor Antoku in 1180, an act that led to the Genpei War (Genpei no Sōran, 1180–1185). The last leader of the Kanmu Heishi bloodline, was eventually destroyed by Minamoto no Yoritomo's armies at the Battle of Dan-no-ura, the last battle of the Genpei War. This story is told in the Heike Monogatari.

This branch of the Kanmu Heishi had many other branches, including Hōjō, Chiba, Miura and Hatakeyama.

Another member of this family was Takamune-ō (804–867), the eldest son of Prince Imperial Kazurahara and grandson of Emperor Kanmu, who received the title of Taira no Ason in the year 825. Thus, there were two groups in Kanmu Heishi, a nucleus that descended from Takamune and another from his nephew, Takamochi (the son of Imperial Prince Takami).

The Oda clan at the time of Oda Nobunaga (1534–1582) also claimed Taira descent, they were descendants of Taira no Chikazane, grandson of Taira no Shigemori (1138–1179).

Genpei War 
During the Heiji Rebellion (1160), the Seiwa Genji leader, Minamoto no Yoshitomo, died in battle. Taira no Kiyomori gained power in Kyoto forging alliances with retired emperors Shirakawa and Toba. Kiyomori sent Minamoto no Yoritomo (1147–1199), the third son of Yoshitomo, into exile. In 1180, Yoritomo organized a large-scale rebellion against the rule of the Taira (the Genpei War or Taira-Minamoto), culminated with the destruction of the Taira by the Minamoto clan and the subjugation of eastern Japan in five years. In 1192, Minamoto no Yoritomo received the title shogun and created the first bakufu based in Kamakura (Kanagawa Prefecture).

Branches 
The Taira clan had four main branches:

Taira Kanmu (Kanmu Heishi, 桓武平氏) – descended from the princes, children of 50th Emperor Kanmu.
Taira Nimmyō (Nimmyō Heishi, 仁明平氏) – descended from the princes, grandchildren of the 54th Emperor Nimmyō's lineage.
Taira Montoku (Montoku Heishi, 文徳平氏) – descended from princes, children of 55th Emperor Montoku.
Taira Kōkō (Kōkō Heishi, 光孝平氏) – descended from the princes, grandchildren of the 58th Emperor Kōkō's lineage.

Clan members 
These were important members of the Taira clan.

Taira no Takakiyo (1173–1199)
Taira no Kiyomori (1118–1181)
Taira no Shigehira (1158–1185)
Taira no Tomomori (1152–1185)
Taira no Munemori (1147–1185)
Taira no Shigemori (1138–1179)
Taira no Tadanori (1144–1184)
Taira no Masakado (903–940)

Mon of the Taira 
The mon (crest, emblem) of the Taira clan is an Agehanochō (揚羽蝶, Swallowtail butterfly) with raised wings.

Gallery

See also
 Japanese name
 Japanese clans
 Taira no Masakado

References

 
Japanese clans